Wilbert Lemon Brown (born May 9, 1977) is a former American football guard and center in the National Football League (NFL) for the San Diego Chargers, Washington Redskins, and New England Patriots. He played college football at the University of Houston.

Brown has also played for the Frankfurt Galaxy of the NFL Europe League.

Early years
Brown played high school football at Hooks High School in Hooks, Texas.

College career
Brown played college football the University of Houston. In his senior season in 1998, he started all 11 games at guard and earned second-team All-Conference USA honors. During his collegiate career, Brown played in 41 games with 31 starts.

Professional career

San Diego Chargers
Brown was signed by the San Diego Chargers as an undrafted free agent in 1999. As a rookie, he saw action in five games.

1977 births
Living people
People from Texarkana, Texas
Players of American football from Texas
American football centers
American football offensive guards
Frankfurt Galaxy players
Houston Cougars football players
New England Patriots players
San Diego Chargers players
Washington Redskins players